National Historic Engineering Landmark may refer to:

 Historic Civil Engineering Landmark (designated by the American Society of Civil Engineers) - see List of Historic Civil Engineering Landmarks
 Historic Mechanical Engineering Landmark (designated by the American Society of Mechanical Engineers) - see List of Historic Mechanical Engineering Landmarks